Ibrahim Labyad is a 2009 Egyptian Action drama film directed by Marwan Hamed.

Cast 
 Ahmed El-Sakka - Ibrahim
 Hend Sabry - Horeya 
 Amr Waked - Ashry
 Mahmoud Abdel Aziz - Abdul-Malek Zarzur
 Bassem Samra - Mahdy
 Sawsan Badr - Horeya's Mother

References

External links 

2009 action films
Egyptian action drama films
Films directed by Marwan Hamed